Neuse Correctional Institution is a minimum and medium security state prison for men in the United States, operated by the State of North Carolina Department of Public Safety in Goldsboro in Wayne County.

Housing 816 prisoners, Neuse Correctional Institution received its first inmates on August 27, 1994. Neuse was built to replace Triangle Correctional Center in Raleigh as the eastern North Carolina processing center for adult male misdemeanants.  The original 500-bed construction project was authorized in July 1992 with a budget of $10.6 million, and another 100-bed dormitory was added to the construction program in July 1993.

Neuse Correctional Institution serves as a medium and minimum custody prison. The prison currently has programs that will assist offenders with transitioning back into the community. The prison currently is housing offenders that are part of the ACDP alcohol and chemical dependency program. Currently the program last 120 days with the opportunity to extend the program to 180 days. Those who complete the program receive a certificate of completion.

Notable inmates
Notable criminals housed at the facility include:
 Crystal Mangum, American murderer responsible for making false rape allegations in the Duke lacrosse case

References

Prisons in North Carolina
Buildings and structures in Wayne County, North Carolina
1994 establishments in North Carolina